

Headline Events of the Year
 First Major League Baseball All-Star Game, July 6 at Comiskey Park: American League, 4–2.
 First Negro League Baseball All-Star Game, September 10, also at Comiskey Park: West, 11–7.

Champions

Major League Baseball
World Series: New York Giants over Washington Senators (4–1)
First All-Star Game, July 6 at Comiskey Park: American League, 4–2

Other champions
The Negro National League was the only Negro league operating this season.  The Chicago American Giants won the pennant.
First Negro League Baseball All-Star Game, September 10 at Comiskey Park: West, 11–7

Awards and honors
Most Valuable Player
Jimmie Foxx, Philadelphia Athletics, 1B (AL)
Carl Hubbell, New York Giants, P (NL)

MLB statistical leaders

Major league baseball final standings

American League final standings

National League final standings

Negro leagues final standings

Negro National League final standings

Homestead was expelled for raiding players.
Several games were included in the standings against non-League teams.
Post-season:
Indianapolis and Pittsburgh won the first half.
Indianapolis beat Pittsburgh in a one-game play-off.
Nashville and Pittsburgh won the second half.
Pittsburgh beat Nashville in a 3-game play-off.
Indianapolis and Pittsburgh tied in a one-game play-off.
Pittsburgh owner/League commissioner awarded the Pennant to Pittsburgh, over the objection of Indianapolis.

Events
As a rookie with the San Francisco Seals of the Pacific Coast League, Joe DiMaggio hit safely in 61 consecutive games, breaking the PCL record of 49 games set by Jack Ness in 1914.

January
January 7 – The Cleveland Indians trade Luke Sewell to the Washington Senators for Roy Spencer.

February
February 9 – Brooklyn Dodgers and future Hall of Fame pitcher Dazzy Vance is traded to the St. Louis Cardinals along with infielder Gordon Slade in exchange for pitcher Ownie Carroll and infielder Jake Flowers.

March
March 11 – An earthquake hits the Los Angeles area, interrupting an exhibition game between the Chicago Cubs and New York Giants. Players from both teams were forced to huddle around the center of the diamond until the tremors stopped.
March 24 – Babe Ruth, another victim of the Great Depression, takes a pay cut of $23,000 from his previous salary of $75,000.

April
April 12 – The Cleveland Indians defeat the Detroit Tigers, 4–1, in thirteen innings on Opening Day.
April 25 :
During the New York Yankees' 16–0 drubbing of the Washington Senators, speedy Yankee outfielder Ben Chapman spikes Senators' second baseman Buddy Myer, leading to a wild 20-minute brawl. 300 fans join in, and all the involved players are suspended for five games and fined $100.
Philadelphia Phillies shortstop Dick Bartell is four-for-four with four doubles in the Phillies' 7–1 victory over the Boston Braves.

May
May 16 – The Washington Senators beat the Cleveland Indians, 11–10, in twelve innings. Cleveland uses five pitchers; Washington uses six. The combined eleven pitchers used was at the time a record.
May 30 – John Stone of the Detroit Tigers becomes the first player in major league history to collect six extra base hits in a regulation length doubleheader‚ as he hit four doubles and two home runs against the St. Louis Browns.

June
June 14 - Both New York Yankees manager Joe McCarthy and first baseman Lou Gehrig are ejected from a game. McCarthy is suspended for three games. Gehrig is luckily not suspended, thus keeping his iron man streak intact.
June 16 – The New York Giants trade Sam Leslie to the Brooklyn Dodgers for Watty Clark and Lefty O'Doul.
June 17 – The Philadelphia Phillies trade Hal Lee and Pinky Whitney to the Boston Braves for Wes Schulmerich and Fritz Knothe.

July
July 2 - The New York Giants' Carl Hubbell tied an MLB record for the longest shutout when he needed 18 innings to beat the St Louis Cardinals 1–0.
July 6 – The first Major League Baseball All-Star Game was held in Comiskey Park, Chicago, home of the Chicago White Sox. The American League defeated the National League, 4–2, highlighted by Babe Ruth's third inning home run
July 19 – Rick and Wes Ferrell become the first brothers on opposing teams to hit home runs in the same game, as Wes' Indians defeat Rick's BoSox, 8–7, in thirteen innings.
July 22 – The Washington Senators and New York Yankees are tied for first with 55–32 records. Washington beats the Detroit Tigers 4–3, while the Yanks fall to the Cleveland Indians 2–1. Washington maintains sole possession of first place for the remainder of the season.
July 26 – Rogers Hornsby joins the St. Louis Browns.
July 30 – St. Louis Cardinals pitcher Dizzy Dean set a modern major league record striking out 17 Chicago Cubs batters. Besides, his battery teammate Jimmie Wilson also sets a new mark for a catcher while recording 18 putouts.

August
August 4 – For the second game in a row, the New York Giants defeat the Philadelphia Phillies 18–1.
August 14 – 1933 American League MVP Jimmie Foxx hits for the cycle, and drives in nine runs to lead the Philadelphia Athletics to an 11–5 victory over the Cleveland Indians.
August 22 – The Detroit Tigers defeat the Washington Senators 10–8, snapping Washington's thirteen-game winning streak.
August 31 – Right-handed Dutch Leonard makes his major league debut, pitching 7.1 innings and giving up three earned runs in the Brooklyn Dodgers' 10–3 loss to the St. Louis Cardinals.

September
September 1 –  New York Giants pitcher Carl Hubbell throws a 10-inning, four-hit shutout and drives in the winning run in a 2–0 victory over the Boston Braves. Hubbell does not walk a batter and never goes as deep as a 3-2 count on any of them. It is both his 20th win and his 10th shutout of the year, while five of the shutouts are 1–0, to set a National League season-record. Braves' pitcher Fred Frankhouse is the hard-luck loser when his mates make two crucial errors in the 10th inning.
September 8 - In the second game of a double header against the Detroit Tigers, Mel Almada makes his MLB debut for the Boston Red Sox. Almada makes history as the first player born in Mexico to play in the major leagues.

October
October 1 :
At Yankee Stadium, Babe Ruth attracts 25‚000 fans as he takes the mound against the Boston Red Sox. Ruth hits a fifth-inning home run and takes a 6–0 lead into the sixth inning‚ then hangs on for a 6–5, complete-game victory. Boston pitcher Bob Kline takes the loss. The Yankees back the Babe with 18 outfield putouts. It is the final pitching appearance of his career. Ruth's record on the mound for the Yankees is a perfect 5–0.
At 57 years old, former Washington Senators pitcher and current coach Nick Altrock takes a pinch hit at-bat in the Senators' eleven inning 3–0 loss to the Philadelphia A's.
October 3 – Mel Ott's two-run home run in the first gives the New York Giants the early lead in game one of the 1933 World Series at the Polo Grounds. They go on to win 4–2.
October 4 – A six-run sixth inning and superb pitching by Hal Schumacher carry the Giants to victory in game two of the World Series.
October 5 – Earl Whitehill shuts out the Giants in game three of the World Series, as Washington takes game three, 4–0.
October 6 – Blondy Ryan's eleventh-inning single gives the Giants the 2–1 victory in game four of the World Series.
October 7 – In Game 5 of the World Series, the Giants defeat the Senators 4–3 in ten innings, to win their fourth World Championship, four games to one. This would be the last World Series the Senators franchise would play in the nation's capital.

November
November 15 :
The St. Louis Cardinals trade Jimmie Wilson to the Philadelphia Phillies for Spud Davis and Eddie Delker.
The New York Giants trade Glenn Spencer to the Cincinnati Reds for George Grantham.
November 21 – Philadelphia Phillies right fielder Chuck Klein, who won the National League Triple Crown after hitting .368 with 28 home runs and 120 RBI, is sold to the Cubs for $125,000 and three players. Klein, who also led the NL in hits (223), doubles (44), extra bases (79), total bases (365), slugging (.602), on-base % (.422) and OPS (1.025), and finished second in runs (102) and fourth in stolen bases (15), is the only player in major league history to be traded after a Triple Crown season.

December
December 12 – The Philadelphia Athletics trade Lefty Grove, Max Bishop, and Rube Walberg to the Boston Red Sox for Bob Kline, Rabbit Warstler and $125,000. They also send Mickey Cochrane to the Detroit Tigers for Johnny Pasek and $100,000, then package Pasek with George Earnshaw, and send them to the Chicago White Sox for Charlie Berry and $20,000.
December 20 – The Washington Senators trade Goose Goslin to the Detroit Tigers for John Stone.

Movies
Elmer, the Great

Births

January
January 1 – Gene Host
January 2 – Bill Oster
January 4 – Ramón Monzant
January 6 – Lenny Green
January 6 – Lee Walls
January 8 – Willie Tasby
January 12 – Audrey Bleiler
January 15 – Bobby Durnbaugh
January 17 – Jay Porter
January 20 – Gene Stephens
January 21 – Rita Keller
January 23 – Wally Shannon
January 25 – Mel Roach

February
February 2 – Jack Reed
February 4 – Shirley Burkovich
February 10 – Jerry Davie
February 10 – Russ Heman
February 10 – Billy O'Dell
February 14 – Tom Borland
February 26 – Johnny Blanchard
February 27 – Sammy Taylor
February 28 – Bill Kern

March
March 4 – John Easton
March 6 – Ted Abernathy
March 7 – Ed Bouchee
March 11 – Ann Garman
March 11 – Jack Spring
March 15 – Dick Scott
March 20 – George Altman
March 25 – Nelson Chittum
March 27 – Don Lassetter

April
April 3 – Jerry Dale
April 3 – Renae Youngberg
April 4 – Ted Wieand
April 7 – Bobby Del Greco
April 7 – Joe Hicks
April 8 – Lloyd Merritt
April 11 – Futoshi Nakanishi
April 12 - Terry Cooney
April 12 – Charley Lau
April 22 – Bob Schmidt
April 25 – Joyce Ricketts
April 29 – Ed Charles

May
May 5 – Joe McClain
May 13 – John Roseboro
May 16 – Bob Bruce
May 18 – Carroll Hardy
May 22 – Miguel Sotelo
May 26 – Ramón López

June
June 2 – Jerry Lumpe
June 2 – Benny Valenzuela
June 4 – Arnold Earley
June 7 – Herb Score
June 9 – Jesús Mora
June 10 – Ed Palmquist
June 14 – Jim Constable
June 16 – Ken Johnson
June 18 – Taylor Phillips
June 23 – Dave Bristol
June 26 – Joe Albanese
June 26 – Gene Green
June 29 – Bob Shaw
June 30 – Dave Roberts

July
July 1 – Frank Baumann
July 8 – Al Spangler
July 9 – Ray Rippelmeyer
July 11 – Katherine Herring
July 23 – Johnny James
July 26 – Norm Siebern

August
August 10 – Rocky Colavito
August 13 – Bob Giggie
August 17 – Jim Davenport
August 19 – Walter Owens

September
September 2 – Glenna Sue Kidd
September 2 – Marv Throneberry
September 11 – Bob Davis
September 12 – Dave Stenhouse
September 14 – Fred Green
September 15 – John Fitzgerald
September 17 – Chuck Daniel
September 26 – Roy Wright
September 27 – Jerry Casale

October
October 9 – Joan Berger
October 12 – Janet Wiley
October 17 – Bob Powell
October 19 – Ossie Álvarez
October 21 – Johnny Goryl
October 22 – Ron Jackson
October 23 – Jake Striker
October 23 – Lois Youngen
October 24 – Bill Bell
October 27 – Pumpsie Green

November
November 4 – Tito Francona
November 7 – Bob Hale
November 9 – George Witt
November 11 – Ken Walters
November 16 – Minnie Mendoza
November 17 – Dan Osinski
November 17 – Orlando Peña
November 18 – Curt Raydon
November 25 – Jim Waugh
November 26 – Minnie Rojas
November 27 – Billy Moran

December
December 4 – Dick Ricketts
December 14 – Jerry Schoonmaker
December 19 – Gordie Windhorn
December 23 – Noella Leduc
December 23 – Elder White
December 31 – Ken Rowe

Deaths

January
January 2 – Kid Gleason, 66, best known as the betrayed manager of the infamous 1919 Chicago White Sox; who previously collected four 20-wins seasons as a pitcher from 1890 to 1893, with a career-high 38 victories in 1890, and later became a timely hitter and steady second baseman, hitting a .300 average four times, while helping the Baltimore Orioles win a pennant in 1895; later serving as a coach, then winning the American League pennant as a rookie manager for the White Sox in 1919, when his heart was broken by his eight players implicated in the 1919 World Series scandal.
January 4 – Hal Deviney, 39, relief pitcher for the Boston Red Sox during the 1920 season.
January 14 – Jesse Hoffmeister, 60, third baseman for the 1897 Pittsburgh Pirates.
January 18 – Dan Marion, 43, pitcher who played with the Brooklyn Tip-Tops.43 in the 1914 and 1915 seasons.
January 19 – Con Starkel, 52, pitcher for the 1906 Washington Senators.
January 19 – Harry Hinchman, 54, pitcher for the Cleveland Naps in the 1907 season.
January 27 – Art Madison, 62, second baseman/shortstop who played for the Philadelphia Phillies in 1895 and the Pittsburgh Pirates in 1899.
January 31 – Beany Jacobson, 51, pitcher for the Washington Senators, St. Louis Browns and Boston Americans in the 1900s decade.

February
February 17 – Harry Smith, 59, British-born baseball player and manager, who caught from 1901 through 1909 for the Philadelphia Athletics, Pittsburgh Pirates and Boston Doves, also managing the Doves in 1909, and later in the minor leagues in a span of five seasons from 1913 to 1917.
February 22 – Bill Shettsline, 69, manager for the Philadelphia Phillies during five seasons spanning 1898–1902, who later owned the team from 1905 to 1909.

March
March 15 – Otis Stocksdale, 61, valuable utility who played all-positions except catcher for the Washington Senators, Boston Beaneaters and Baltimore Orioles from 1893 to 1896, while helping the Orioles win the National League pennant in 1896.
March 16 – Jack Wieneke, 39, pitcher who played briefly for the Chicago White Sox during the 1921 season.
March 20 – Dan Burke, 64, catcher/outfielder who played from 1890 to 1892 for the Rochester Broncos, Syracuse Stars and Boston Beaneaters.
March 21 – Bob Black, 70, outfielder/pitcher who played for the Kansas City Cowboys of the Union Association in 1884.
March 25 – Tom Donovan, 60, outfielder for the 1901 Cleveland Blues of the American League.
March 28 – Tom McCarthy, 48, pitcher who played from 1908 to 1909 with the Cincinnati Reds, Pittsburgh Pirates and Boston Doves.
March 29 – Harry Salisbury, 77, pitcher for the 1879 Troy Trojans of the National League and the 1882 Pittsburgh Alleghenys of the American Association, who finished in the top ten in eighteen categories during the 1882 season, including wins (20), strikeouts (135), earned run average (2.63), complete games (32), and innings pitched (335).
March 29 – Ed Watkins, 55, outfielder for the 1902 Philadelphia Phillies.

April
April 2 – Joe Cross, 75, right fielder who played briefly for the Louisville Colonels during the 1888 season.
April 13 – Ody Abbott, 44, outfielder for the 1910 St. Louis Cardinals.
April 17 – Thomas Griffin, 76, first baseman for the Milwaukee Brewers of the Union Association in 1884.
April 23 – Tim Keefe, 76, Hall of Fame pitcher who posted a 342–225 record and a 2.63 ERA in 600 games, including six 30-win campaigns for the New York Metropolitans/Giants teams from 1883 to 1888, with 40-win seasons in 1883 and 1886, while leading the National League in ERA three times and strikeouts twice, with career strikeout mark (2500+) being record until 1908, also winning 19 straight in 1888, leading the Giants to their first pennant while going 4–0 with 0.51 ERA in the championship series.
April 26 – Roy Graham, 38, backup catcher who played from 1922 to 1923 for the Chicago White Sox.

May
May 1 – Bobby Mitchell, 77, National League pitcher who played for the Cincinnati Reds, Cleveland Blues and St. Louis Brown Stockings in parts of four seasons spanning 1877–1882.
May 3 – Lefty James, 43, pitcher who played from 1912 through 1914 for the Cleveland Naps of the American League.
May 5 – Steve Dunn, 74, Canadian first baseman who played for the 1884 St. Paul Saints of the Union Association.
May 17 – Bill Van Dyke, 69, outfielder who played with the Toledo Maumees, St. Louis Browns and Boston Beaneaters in a span of three years from 1890 to 1893.
May 19 – Wes Curry, 73, American Association umpire for six seasons between 1885 and 1898, who previously pitched two games for the Richmond Virginians in the 1884 season.
May 20 – Billy Lauder, 59, third baseman who played four seasons between 1898 and 1903 for the Philadelphia Phillies, Philadelphia Athletics and New York Giants, and later coached for the Chicago White Sox.
May 21 – Charlie Osterhout76, outfielder/catcher for the 1879 Syracuse Stars.of the National League.
May 22 – Bunny Pearce, 48,  backup catcher for the Cincinnati Reds from 1908 to 1909.
May 24 – Phonney Martin, 87, player/manager for the 1872 Brooklyn Eckfords of the National Association, who also played for the 1872 Troy Trojans and the 1873 New York Mutuals.
May 30 – Burley Bayer, 59, shortstop for the 1889 Louisville Colonels of the American Association.

June
June 3 – Jack O'Brien, 60, outfielder for four clubs between 1899 and 2003, who became the first player to pinch-hit in World Series history, as a member of the 1903 Boston Americans.
June 5 – Sam LaRocque, 70, Canadian second baseman for the Detroit Wolverines, Pittsburgh Alleghenys/Pirates and Louisville Colonels in parts of three seasons spanning 1888–1891.
June 13 – Gat Stires, 83, outfielder who played from 1868 to 1871 for the Rockford Forest Citys of the National Association.

July
July 2 -Tommy Dowd, 64, center fielder for seven clubs in two different leagues between 1891 and 1901, mainly for the St. Louis Browns of the National League, who posted a career average of .271 with 368 stolen bases and also managed the Browns from 1896 to 1897.
July 7 – Neal Finn, 29, second baseman who played for the  Brooklyn Robins/Dodgers and the Philadelphia Phillies from 1930 through 193s; played his last MLB game on June 17, twenty days before his death.
July 12 – Joseph Herr, 68, National League infielder/outfielder during three seasons from 1887 to 1890 for the Cleveland Blues and the St. Louis Browns.
July 23 – Rip Williams, 51, versatile utility who played in four seasons for the Boston Red Sox, Washington Senators and Cleveland Indians between 1911 and 1918.
July 30 – Frank Allen, 44, National League pitcher who played from 1912 to 1917 for the Brooklyn Dodgers/Robins, Pittsburgh Rebels and Boston Braves.

August
August 7 – Bill Irwin, 73, pitcher for the 1886 Cincinnati Red Stockings of the American Association.
August 10 – George Mangus, 43, outfielder who played for the 1912 Philadelphia Phillies.
August 13 – Elliot Bigelow, 35, outfielder for the Boston Red Sox in the 1929 season.

September
September 3 – Ed Cartwright, 73, first baseman for the St. Louis Browns in 1890 and the Washington Senators from 1894 to 1897, who collected seven runs batted in in one inning of an American Association game in 1890, setting a major league record  that would stand for 109 years until it was broken by St. Louis Cardinals' Fernando Tatís, who belted two grand slams in one inning during a 1999 game to drive in eight runs.
September 13 – Bill Brennan, 52, umpire who worked during seven seasons in the National League (1909–1913, 1921) and the Federal League (1914–1915), including the 1911 World Series, and also spent many years of umpiring in the minor leagues with the American Association and the Southern Association.
September 13 – Joe Harrington, 63, infielder for the Boston Beaneaters from 1895 to 1896, who in 1895 became the first major league ballplayer ever to hit a home run in his first at bat.
September 16 – George Gore, 76, center fielder who played 14 seasons in three leagues from 1879 to 1892, who batted a career .301 average, won the 1880 National League batting title and appeared in four World Series, while leading the league in walks three times and runs twice, and setting a single-game record with seven stolen bases.
September 22 – George Fields, 80, third baseman who played briefly for the  Middletown Mansfields of the National Association during the 1872 season.
September 24 – Mike Donlin, 36, outfielder for six teams between 1899 and 1912; a superb hitter during the deadball era who topped the .300 mark in 10 of his 12 major league seasons, hitting .356 and leading the National League with 124 runs in 1905, then guiding the New York Giants with six hits in their 1905 World Series victory over the Philadelphia Athletics, while retiring with a .333 career average in 1050 games.
September 25 – Ring Lardner, 48, sports columnist and short story writer for several newspapers since 1907, mainly for the Chicago Tribune, who pioneered the satirical cynic's view of sports reporting in the early 1920s.

October
October 5 – William Veeck, Sr., 55, sports writer and baseball executive, who was president of the Chicago Cubs from 1919 until the time of his death, whose leadership led the Cubs win three National League pennants in the 1918, 1929 and 1932 seasons.
October 10 – Joe Kostal, 57, pitcher who played briefly for the 1896 Louisville Colonels.
October 13 – Al Mannassau, 67, minor league outfielder/manager during six seasons from 1890 to 1895, who later served as an umpire in the National League (1899), American League (1901), and the Federal League (1914).
October 20 – Lou Gertenrich, 58. outfielder who played with the Milwaukee Brewers and the Pittsburgh Pirates in a span of two seasons from 1901 to 1903.
October 22 – Philip DeCatesby Ball, 70, owner of the St. Louis Terriers of the "outlaw" Federal League from 1914–1915, and the St. Louis Browns of the American League from 1916 until his death.
October 22 – Bobby Clack, 83, English outfielder the Brooklyn Atlantics and the Cincinnati Reds from 1874 through 1876, who also served as an umpire during five games in 1876.
October 31 – Charlie Loudenslager, 52, second baseman who played in one game for the 1904 Brooklyn Superbas of the National League.

November
November 1 – Ed Scott, 63, pitcher from 1900 to 1901 for the Cincinnati Reds and Cleveland Blues.
November 2 – Lew Phelan, 69, manager for the 1895 St. Louis Browns of the National League.
November 5 – Frank Freund, 58, backup catcher for the 1896 Louisville Colonels.
November 18 – Charles Strick, 75, catcher/second baseman/centerfielder who played for the 1882 Louisville Eclipse of the American Association.
November 29 – John Humphries, 72, Canadian catcher/outfielder/first baseman who played from 1883 through 1885 for the New York Gothams of the National League and the Washington Nationals of the American Association.

December
December 7 – Fred Hoey, 68, manager for the 1899 New York Giants of the National League.
December 11 – Harry Croft, 58, National League OF/IF utility man who played in 1899 with the Louisville Colonels and the Philadelphia Phillies, before joining the Chicago Orphans in 1901.
December 17 – Charlie DeArmond, 56, third baseman for the 1903 Cincinnati Reds.
December 18 – Fred Robinson, 77, second baseman for the 1884 Cincinnati Outlaw Reds of the Union Association.
December 21 – Louie Heilbroner, 72, manager for the St. Louis Cardinals during the 1902 season.
December 22 – Nin Alexander, 75, catcher who played in 1884 for the Kansas City Unions of the Union Association and the St. Louis Browns of the American Association.
December 22 – Joe Flynn, 71, outfielder who played in 1884 for the Philadelphia Keystones and Boston Reds of the Union Association.
December 27 – Fritz Buelow, 57, fine defensive catcher during nine seasons from 1899 to 1907 for the St. Louis Perfectos/Cardinals, Detroit Tigers, Cleveland Naps and St. Louis Browns, who is regarded as the first ballplayer born in Berlin, Germany, to appear in a major league game.
December 31 – James Donnelly, 66, third baseman for the 1884 Kansas City Cowboys of the Union Association.

References